Ustym Volodymyrovych Holodnyuk (August 12, 1994, Zbarazh – February 20, 2014, Kyiv, buried in Zbarazh) was a Ukrainian supporter of Euromaidan and member of the 38th legion of self-defence.

Biography 
Holodnyuk graduated from Lviv State College — advanced military and physical training in 2011. He had been studying at the National University of Life and Environmental Sciences of Ukraine "Berezhany Agrotechnical Institute" at the time he joined the Maidan-the protesters uprising against Yanukovych.

Participation in the Maidan 
Holodnyuk went to Kyiv to participate in protests in November 2013 where he received a head injury. Upon getting better, he returned to the Independence Square. He died on 20 February 2014 as a result of a gunshot wound to his head by an unidentified sniper. He was shot while trying to recover wounded Euromaidan militants near the upper exit from the Khreshchatyk Metro Station. The sniper's bullet hit at the back of his head and exited just above his right eye. Armed Maidan's self-defence legions' members were able to recover his body and take it to the hotel 'Ukraine' which had been commandeered by the militants as a place to rest during quiet hours.

Eyewitness 
"On the 20th of February, I and other activists were helping to recover our friends wounded or killed during clashes on the Institutska Street. At that time I even didn't know that Ustym had return to the Independence Square. When we picked him up, he had been already dead. I didn't recognise him at first until I pulled the passport out of his pocket when we were back to the hotel "Ukraine" (Yuriy Teleschuk).

The last words Holodnyuk wrote on his Facebook page were: "Slaves are not allowed to enter paradise!" (Lida Punkiv, Facebook).

Honoring the memory 
On March 27, 2014 the 24th Berezhany session of the city council decided to assign the title of "Honorary Citizen of Bershany" posthumously to Ustym Volodymyrovych Holodnyuk. Deputies also voted for the City Square, which is located between Armenian and Academic Streets, to be renamed "The Square of Ustym Holodnyuk" and to establish a memorial in honour of the "Heroes of the Maidan" there.
The 38th legion of self-defence, of which he was a member, is named after Ustym Holodnyuk.

References 

 Olena Stadnyk "40 days after Ustym or 400 km" (рос.)
 Ustym Holodnyuk died in Kyiv, as a result of a gunshot wound in his head when he was helping to pick up the dead bodies (video)
 «He asked to scream «The sky is falling». Ustym Holodnyuk — The hero of Ukraine
 The title of “Honorary Citizen of Bershany” posthumously to Holodnyuk Ustym Volodymyrovych who was a civil activist of Euromaidan, fighter of 38thlegion of self-defence

1994 births
2014 deaths
People of the Euromaidan
People from Zbarazh
Deaths by firearm in Ukraine
Recipients of the Order of Gold Star (Ukraine)